Ida Jones may refer to:
 Ida Jones (athlete), English athlete
 Ida E. Jones (painter), African American folk painter
 Ida E. Jones (historian), American historian and author